Protivín is a town in Písek District in the South Bohemian Region of the Czech Republic. It has about 4,700 inhabitants.

Administrative parts
Villages of Chvaletice, Krč, Maletice, Milenovice, Myšenec, Protivín, Selibov, Těšínov and Záboří are administrative parts of Protivín.

Geography

The Blanice River flows through the town. There are several ponds in the territory.

History
The first written mention of Protivín is from 1282. It was founded around 1260 as a village and fortress by a ford across the river Blanice.

In the late 19th century Protivín developed, the prosperity however ended with the closure of the sugar factory and a wave of emigration, especially to Iowa in the United States, where the settlement named Protivin was founded by immigrants in 1872. However, the population continued to grow, and in 1899, Protivín was promoted to a town.

Demographics

Economy
The town is known for the Protivín Brewery, which produces a regional beer label Platan. It was founded in 1598.

Sights

There are three churches in the municipal territory. Church of Saint Elizabeth on the town square was built in 1662 in the early Baroque style. Church of Saint Gall in Myšenec is from the end of the 11th century and after several reconstructions it still retains its Gothic character. Church of Saint Wenceslaus in Krč was built in 1352.

A Renaissance castle is located on the town square.

The Crocodile Zoo Protivín was established in 2008 and is unique by breeding of all of Crocodilia species.

There are several homesteads built in the folk baroque style.

Notable people
Marta Krásová (1901–1970), operatic singer
Jiří Kolář (1914–2002), poet, writer, painter and translator

Gallery

See also
Protivin, Iowa (named after Protivín)

References

External links

Cities and towns in the Czech Republic
Populated places in Písek District
Prácheňsko